There are a number of Iraqi beauty pageants. Miss Iraq is one of the national beauty pageants in Iraq. Others include miss World Iraq and Miss Earth Iraq.

History 

In 2015 the first season after 43 years absence, the official national beauty contest of Iraq recognized by Ministry of Culture, Tourism & Antiquities has been held in Baghdad. The Miss Iraq titles set to be three categories which are Miss Iraq, Iraq's Maiden of Beauty and Mesopotamian Princess.

The pageant is organized by a group of civil activists, leaders from the beauty/fashion community and with the support of the Ministry of Culture, Tourism & Antiquities of Iraq.

In 2016, Miss Iraq Organization sent Miss Mesopotamia 2015 winner Susan Amer Sulaimani (Noori), a Kurdish student in Baghdad to participate in the Miss Earth 2016 pageant as Iraq's first representative since 1972 in the Big Four international beauty pageants. She wore a dress instead of a bikini during the pageant's press conference.

National franchise holders 
The Miss Iraq returned and debut to the Big League Pageants like Miss Earth in 2016 and then Miss Universe in 2017.

Titleholders

Big Four pageants representatives 
The following women have represented Iraq in the Big Four international beauty pageants, the four major international beauty pageants for women. These are Miss World, Miss Universe, Miss International and Miss Earth.

Miss Universe Iraq

Miss World Iraq

Miss Earth Iraq

Miss Sulaymaniyah Iraq

References

External links 

 missuniverseiraq.com
 missiraq.net

Iraq
Iraq
Iraq
Recurring events established in 1972
Entertainment events in Iraq